The Zero1 USA World Junior Heavyweight Championship is a title defended in Pro Wrestling Zero1's American affiliate Zero1 USA. The title was previously defended in the Midwest territory of the National Wrestling Alliance as the NWA Midwest X Division Championship until 2011 when NWA Midwest disbanded following the stripping of Almighty Sheik (chairman of the territory) of the NWA Worlds Heavyweight Championship by NWA president Robert Trobich.

Title history

Combined reigns 

{| class="wikitable sortable" style="text-align: center"
!Rank
!Wrestler
!No. ofreigns
!Combined days
|-
!1
| Oliver Cain || 1 || 812
|-
!2
| Jake Parnell || 2 || 609
|-
!3
| Matt Cage || 2 || 576
|-
!4
| Jake Lander || 2 || 560
|-
!5
| Jason Dukes || 1 || 505
|-
!6
| Matt Sydal || 2 || 472
|-
!7
| Jonathan Gresham || 1 || 362
|-
!8
| Troy Walters || 2 || 322
|-
!9
| Victor Analog || 1 || 287
|-
!10
| Jordan Perry || 1 || 266
|-
!11
| Alex Shelley || 1 || 245
|-
!12
| Blake Steel || 1 || 238
|-
!13
| Egotistico Fantastico || 1 || 229
|-
!14
| Jimmy Karryt || 1 || 224 
|-
!15
| Austin Aries || 1 || 216
|-
!16
| Mat Fitchett || 1 || 207
|-
!17
| Mason Quinn || 1 || 169-197
|-
!rowspan=2|18
| Dysfunction || 1 || 119
|-
| Gary Jay || 1 || 119
|-
!20
| Delirious || 1 || 112
|-
!21
| Jaysin Strife || 1 || 91
|-
!22
| Justin Kage || 1 || 82
|-
!23
| Bobby Valentino || 1 || 63
|-
!24
| Mickey McCoy || 1 || 49
|-
!25
| Arya Daivari || 1 || <1

References

External links
NWA Midwest X Division Title history
ZERO1 USA World Junior Heavyweight Title history

Pro Wrestling Zero1 championships
National Wrestling Alliance championships
X Division championships
Junior heavyweight wrestling championships
Regional professional wrestling championships
World professional wrestling championships